Barbara Joan Pyrah (1943–2016) was a British geologist, museum curator, and illustrator.

Career
From 1965–1968 Pyrah was the assistant keeper of geology at the Manchester Museum. From 1968 to her retirement in 1988, Pyrah was the Keeper of Geology at the Yorkshire Museum. During her time at the Yorkshire Museum Pyrah produced a four-part catalogue detailing the type and figured fossil specimens held in the collections. This catalogue represented over 900 specimens from approximately 150 publications. The research interest in the collections of the museum rose considerably as a result of these published catalogues.

Pyrah illustrated the 1977 publication The Ice Age in Yorkshire.

Pyrah was a member of the organising committee of the Geological Curators' Group from 1975 to 1977.

She retired from the museum due to ill-health in 1988; In retirement she was a member of the Dunnington Art Club and a founding member of the Friends of Hagg Wood.

She is listed as one of the donors to the mosaic map in York Museum Gardens.

Exhibitions
Pyrah organised a major exhibition at the Yorkshire Museum: 'A New Look at the Dinosaurs' was opened in April 1984 by David Bellamy. The exhibition was inspired by a 1979 book of the same name by Alan J. Charig, who gave a lecture in the museum in celebration of its opening. The exhibition received a favourable review in New Scientist, which described it as "an exhibition of unimpeachable scholarship which provides something of interest and enjoyment at any and every age. Over 335,000 visitors saw the exhibition by the end of its year-long display.

Publications
Pyrah, B. J. 1974. "Collections and Collectors of Note. 3. Yorkshire Museum". Geological Curators Group Newsletter 1(2). 52–55.
Pyrah, B.1976. "Catalogue of the type and figured fossils in the Yorkshire Museum: part 1", Proceedings of the Yorkshire Geological Society 41(1.4)
Pyrah, B.1977. "Catalogue of the type and figured fossils in the Yorkshire Museum: part 2", Proceedings of the Yorkshire Geological Society 41(2.23)
Pyrah, B.1978. "Catalogue of the type and figured fossils in the Yorkshire Museum: part 3", Proceedings of the Yorkshire Geological Society 41(4.32)
Pyrah, B.1979. "Catalogue of the type and figured fossils in the Yorkshire Museum: part 4", Proceedings of the Yorkshire Geological Society 42(3.24)
Pyrah, B. J. 1981. "Edward Charlesworth and the British Natural History Society. 1: Material in the Yorkshire Museum", The Geological Curator 3(2). 88–92.
Pyrah, B. J. 1988. The history of the Yorkshire Museum and its geological collections. York: The Ebor Press.

References

1943 births
2016 deaths
Women geologists
British curators
Yorkshire Museum people
Members of the Yorkshire Philosophical Society
Manchester Museum people
British women curators